
The sack-back gown or robe à la française was a women's fashion of 18th century Europe. At the beginning of the century, the sack-back gown was a very informal style of dress. At its most informal, it was unfitted both front and back and called a sacque, contouche, or robe battante. By the 1770s the sack-back gown was second only to court dress in its formality. This style of gown had fabric at the back arranged in box pleats which fell loose from the shoulder to the floor with a slight train.  In front, the gown was open, showing off a decorative stomacher and petticoat. It would have been worn with a wide square hoop or panniers under the petticoat.  Scalloped ruffles often trimmed elbow-length sleeves, which were worn with separate frills called engageantes.

The casaquin (popularly known from the 1740s onwards as a pet-en-l'air) was an abbreviated version of the robe à la française worn as a jacket for informal wear with a matching or contrasting petticoat. The skirt of the casaquin was knee-length but gradually shortened until by the 1780s it resembled a peplum.

The loose box pleats which are a feature of this style are sometimes called Watteau pleats from their appearance in the paintings of Antoine Watteau. The various Watteau terms, such as Watteau pleat, Watteau back, Watteau gown etc., date from the mid-19th century rather than reflecting authentic 18th century terminology, and normally describe 19th and 20th century revivals of the sack-back.

Notable wearers
A popular story, traced back to the correspondence of Élisabeth Charlotte d'Orléans, Duchess d'Orléans, is that the earliest form of the sack-back gown, the robe battante, was invented as maternity clothing in the 1670s by Louis XIV's mistress to conceal her clandestine pregnancies. However, people would comment: "Madame de Montespan has put on her robe battante, therefore she must be pregnant." A similar story is associated with Marie Louise Élisabeth d'Orléans, Duchess of Berry, who during the French Regency of 1715-1723 was known for wearing this style of gown which showcased her bosom and face whilst, as with Madame de Montespan, disguising illicit pregnancies.

Galleries

18th century

Post-18th century revival styles

See also
 1700–1750 in fashion
 1750–1775 in fashion

References

Bibliography
Arnold, Janet. Patterns of Fashion 1: Englishwomen's dresses & their construction c. 1660–1860. Drama Publishers, 1977. 
Burnston, Sharon Ann. Fitting and Proper: 18th Century Clothing from the Collection of the Chester County Historical Society. Scurlock Pub Co, 2000. 
Hart, Avril, and Susan North. Seventeenth and Eighteenth-Century Fashion in Detail. V&A Publishing, 2009. 

Ribeiro, Aileen: The Art of Dress: Fashion in  England and France 1750–1820, Yale University Press, 1995, 
Ribeiro, Aileen: Dress in Eighteenth Century Europe 1715–1789, Yale University Press, 2002,

External links

18th Century Robes à la Française
How to Make a Contouche, also known as sack back dress, saque, or robe à la française

Gowns
Fashion
History of clothing (Western fashion)